The Primetime Emmy Award for Multi-Camera Picture Editing for a Comedy Series was awarded to one television series each year. Between 2003 and 2012, the category was consolidated to include both multi-camera and single-camera comedy series. In 2023, the category will be combined with Single-Camera Comedy Series to form Outstanding Picture Editing for a Comedy Series.

In the following list, the first titles listed in gold are the winners; those not in gold are nominees, which are listed in alphabetical order. The years given are those in which the ceremonies took place.



Winners and nominations

Outstanding Videotape Editing for a Series

1970s

1980s

Outstanding Multi-Camera Editing for a Series

1990s

Outstanding Multi-Camera Picture Editing for a Comedy Series

2000s

Between 2008 and 2011, multi-camera sitcoms competed alongside single-camera sitcoms for Outstanding Picture Editing for a Comedy Series (Single or Multi-Camera).

2010s

2020s
{| class="wikitable" style="width:100%"
|- style="background:#bebebe;"
! style="width:5%;"| Year
! style="width:25%;"| Program
! style="width:25%;"| Episode
! style="width:40%;"| Nominees
! style="width:5%;"| Network
|-
|rowspan=5 style="text-align:center; | 2020(72nd)
|-style="background:#FAEB86;"
| One Day at a Time
| align=center| "Boundaries"
| Cheryl Campsmith
| Pop TV
|-
| The Conners
| align=center| "Slappy Holidays"
| Brian Schnuckel
| ABC
|-
| rowspan=2| Will & Grace
| align=center| "We Love Lucy"
| Peter Beyt
| rowspan=2| NBC
|-
| align=center| "What a Dump"
| Joseph Fulton
|-
|rowspan=4 style="text-align:center; | 2021(73rd)
|-style="background:#FAEB86;"
| The Conners
| align=center| "Jeopardé, Sobrieté And Infidelité"
| Brian Schnuckel
| ABC
|-
| Man with a Plan
| align=center| "Driving Miss Katie"
| Sue Federman
| rowspan=2| CBS
|-
| Mom
| align=center| "Scooby-Doo Checks and Salisbury Steak"
| Joe Bella
|-
|rowspan=3 style="text-align:center; | 2022(74th)
|-style="background:#FAEB86;"
| How I Met Your Father| align=center| "Timing Is Everything"
| Sue Federman
| Hulu
|-
| Call Me Kat| align=center| "Call Me by My Middle Name"
| Pam Marshall
| Fox
|-
|}

Programs with multiple awards
Totals include wins for Outstanding Picture Editing for a Comedy Series (Single or Multi-Camera).

8 wins
 Frasier4 wins
 The Big Bang Theory3 wins
 How I Met Your Mother Seinfeld2 wins
 Cheers Fame Murphy Brown One Day at a Time Two and a Half MenPrograms with multiple nominations
Totals include nominations for Outstanding Picture Editing for a Comedy Series (Single or Multi-Camera).

14 nominations
 Frasier11 nominations
 Will & Grace9 nominations
 The Big Bang Theory Murphy Brown7 nominations
 Cheers Friends Seinfeld6 nominations
 How I Met Your Mother5 nominations
 Everybody Loves Raymond Home Improvement Mom4 nominations
 Coach One Day at a Time 2 Broke Girls3 nominations
 Barbara Mandrell and the Mandrell Sisters The Conners Fame The Golden Girls Hot in Cleveland The Larry Sanders Show Newhart Night Court That '70s Show The Tracey Ullman Show Two and a Half Men2 nominations
 The Colbert Report The Cosby Show The Daily Show with Jon Stewart Designing Women Last Man Standing Married... with Children Mike & Molly The Muppet Show Roseanne Sports Night WKRP in Cincinnati''

References

Multi-Camera Picture Editing for a Comedy Series